Secret Obsession is a 2019 American psychological thriller film directed by Peter Sullivan, who co-wrote the screenplay with Kraig Wenman. It stars Brenda Song, Mike Vogel, Dennis Haysbert, and Ashley Scott.

It was released on July 18, 2019, by Netflix.

Plot
On a rainy night, a woman (Brenda Song) flees down the street from an unknown pursuer. She is struck by a car, leaving her injured and unconscious. She wakes up in the hospital with amnesia, recalling nothing about the incident or her life prior. A man by her bedside (Mike Vogel) introduces himself as Russell Williams, her husband, and says that her name is Jennifer. To help her regain memories, he shows her photos of her life, telling her that her parents died in a fire two years ago, that she had quit her job, and that she rarely talks to her friends anymore.

Detective Frank Page (Dennis Haysbert), obsessed with his work after failing to find his own daughter's kidnapper, investigates Jennifer's accident and grows suspicious of Russell, who drives a truck similar to one seen in the vicinity where Jennifer was hit. After Jennifer is discharged, Russell takes her to their secluded home. Jennifer is haunted by brief flashes of memories from the rainy night of her accident. She becomes uneasy by Russell's strange behavior and realizes that he has been locking her inside the house at night. She also notices that most of the photos in her home have been manipulated. Frank's investigation leads him to Jennifer's parents' home, where he finds their rotting corpses. He learns from Jennifer's former employer that "Russell" is actually Ryan Gaerity, a temperamental worker fired over two months ago.

While Ryan is out, Jennifer finds her own ID in his wallet, which she uses to unlock his computer. She finds images of her actual husband Russell (Daniel Booko) and realizes the danger she's in. Before she can escape, Ryan knocks her unconscious and chains her to the bed while he goes out to get supplies. When he returns, the real Russell's corpse is revealed to be in his car trunk.

Frank arrives at their home and tries to rescue Jennifer, but Ryan knocks him out, locking him in a freezer. He rants to Jennifer that he had loved her for years but her lack of reciprocation and marriage to Russell enraged him, leading him to kill Russell and take Jennifer for himself. Jennifer manages to escape into the forest with Ryan giving chase. Knowing that Jennifer will never love him, Ryan decides to kill her with his gun, but Frank tackles him before he can shoot her, and Jennifer takes the gun and shoots Ryan in the arm. A wounded Ryan desperately attempts to run towards Jennifer to retrieve the gun, but Jennifer fires another shot, ultimately killing Ryan.

Three months later, Frank gives Jennifer a note from her late husband that he had found during the investigation. As she drives, leaving for San Jose, Russell's voice narrates the note, telling her how much he loves her.

Cast
 Brenda Song as Jennifer Allen Williams
 Mike Vogel as Ryan Gaerity / The fake Russell Williams
 Dennis Haysbert as Detective Frank Page
 Ashley Scott as Nurse Masters
 Paul Sloan as Jim Kahn
 Daniel Booko as The real Russell Williams
 Scott Peat as Ray
 Blair Hickey as Scott
 Michael Patrick McGill as Captain Fitzpatrick
 Casey Leach as Charlie Kimble
 Jim Hanna as Dr. East
 Ciarra Carter as Desk Nurse
 Eric Etebari as Xander
 Kati Salowsky as Cashier
 Jennifer Peo as Mother

Production
Principal photography for the film took place on location in Pomona and Malibu, California, in 2018.

Release
The film was released on July 18, 2019 by Netflix. On October 17, 2019, Netflix announced that the film had been viewed by over 40 million viewers after its release on their platform.

Reception
The website's critical consensus reads: "While it may offer some thrills and unintentional laughs, Secret Obsession is mostly a formulaic and dumb thriller."

NPR's Linda Holmes said in their satirical review, "This is a pretty bad movie, but it seems to be bad in the way it's meant to be bad. It's cheerfully trashy, and if that's up your alley, have at it."

References

External links 
 
 

2019 films
2010s mystery thriller films
2019 psychological thriller films
2010s serial killer films
American mystery thriller films
American psychological thriller films
American serial killer films
Films about amnesia
Films about murderers
Films about stalking
Films scored by James Dooley
Films set in California
Films shot in California
English-language Netflix original films
2010s English-language films
2010s American films